Willy von Känel (30 October 1909 – 28 April 1991) was a Swiss footballer who played for Switzerland in the 1934 FIFA World Cup. He also played for FC Biel-Bienne and Servette FC.

References

1909 births
1991 deaths
People from La Chaux-de-Fonds
Swiss men's footballers
Switzerland international footballers
1934 FIFA World Cup players
Association football forwards
FC Biel-Bienne players
Servette FC players
Sportspeople from the canton of Neuchâtel
Willy